Prodromos "Makis" Nikolaidis (alternate spelling: Nikolaides) (Greek: Πρόδρομος "Μάκης" Νικολαΐδης; born July 13, 1978) is a former Greek-Cypriot professional basketball player. At a height of 2.01 m (6'7") tall, and 102 kg (225 lbs.) in weight, he could play both the shooting guard and small forward positions. During his playing career, Nikolaidis possessed great shooting ability. In 2008, he won the 3-point shootout competition of the Greek League All-Star Game.

Professional career
In 2003, Nikolaidis won the EuroCup Challenge championship, while playing with Aris Thessaloniki. In 2004, he was a EuroChallenge finalist, while playing with Maroussi. He spent the 2007–08 season with Aigaleo. Nikolaidis moved to Trikala 2000 for the 2008–09 season. He then moved to AEK Athens. In September 2012, he joined New Basket Brindisi, for a trial period.

He joined Ethnikos Piraeus in 2018.

Awards and accomplishments
FIBA EuroCup Challenge Champion: (2003)
Greek All-Star Game 3 Point Shootout Champion: (2008)
2× Greek League All-Star: (2010, 2011)

References

External links
EuroCup Profile
Eurobasket.com Profile
FIBA.com Profile
AEK Profile
Draftexpress.com Profile
Italian League Profile 
Greek Basket League Profile 

1978 births
Living people
AEK B.C. players
Aigaleo B.C. players
Basketball Agia Paraskevi players
Apollon Limassol BC players
Aris B.C. players
Cypriot men's basketball players
Esperos B.C. players
Greek men's basketball players
Greek Basket League players
Ionikos N.F. B.C. players
Kavala B.C. players
Maroussi B.C. players
Olympia Larissa B.C. players
Shooting guards
Small forwards
Trikala B.C. players
Virtus Bologna players
Basketball players from Kavala